WBEV may refer to:

 WBEV (AM), a radio station (1430 AM) licensed to serve Beaver Dam, Wisconsin, United States
 WBEV-FM, a radio station (95.3 FM) licensed to serve Beaver Dam, Wisconsin